The women's Laser Radial class at the 2014 ISAF Sailing World Championships was held in Santander, Spain 12–18 September.

Results

References

Laser Radial
Laser Radial World Championships